The highest-selling albums and EPs in the United States are ranked in the Billboard 200, published by Billboard magazine. The date are compiled by Nielsen Soundscan based on each album's weekly physical sales. In 2000, 20 albums topped the chart in 53 issues of the magazine, but two of which albums started their peak position in 1999 and are therefore excluded.

Pop group NSYNC's No Strings Attached, rapper Eminem's The Marshall Mathers LP, and rock group The Beatles' compilation album 1 are the longest-running albums of 2000 and second in 2000s, behind Taylor Swift in 2009 with Fearless which logged eleven non-consecutive weeks at number one. The first two of which albums topped the Billboard 200 for eight straight weeks. 1 charted for eight non-consecutive weeks, of which stretch began in late 2000 and continued in early 2001. No Strings Attached, The Marshall Mathers LP, and 1 are credited as three of the longest-running albums of the decade. Rock artist Santana's Supernatural topped the chart for nine non-consecutive weeks in 2000, but is credited as the longest-running album of 1999 because it first peaked in that year.

No Strings Attached is the best-selling album of 2000, accumulating nearly 9.94 million sales by the end of the year. The album was noted for its debut sales figure of 2.4 million, the highest first-week sales in the Billboard 200 history. The figure marked as the only album to have sold more than two million copies in a one-week period, a distinction held until the release of Adele's 25.  Rapper Eminem's The Marshall Mathers LP sold over 7.92 million copies, the second best-selling album of 2000. The album's debut sales, over 1.76 million, held the distinction as the second best sales in a week. Singer Britney Spears's Oops!... I Did It Again sold nearly 7.89 million copies, making it the third highest-selling album of the year. The album opened at number one on the Billboard 200 on the strength of over 1.3 million unit sales, breaking the record for first-week sales by a female act. Debut sales of Oops!... I Did It Again broke the record set by singer Alanis Morissette's Supposed Former Infatuation Junkie, which opened with 469,054 sales. It also shattered singer Mariah Carey's record, whose album Daydream sold 759,959 copies during the week of Christmas 1995. Band Backstreet Boys' Black & Blue sold 1.6 million units in its debut week, besting their album Millennium's figure of 1.13 million.

2000 had the fewest Billboard 200 leaders among women since 1996, with only Britney Spears, Celine Dion and Madonna having a number one album this year.

Chart history

See also
2000 in music
List of number-one albums (United States)

References

External links
 Billboard 200 – 2000 archive

United States Albums
2000